The NWA Macon Heavyweight Championship was a professional wrestling regional championship in Georgia Championship Wrestling (GCW). It was a secondary title, complementing the NWA Macon Tag Team Championship, and defended almost exclusively at the Macon City Auditorium and Macon Coliseum throughout the 1970s.

The Macon titles were one of two sets of GCW's citywide championships, along with the NWA Columbus Heavyweight Championship and NWA Columbus Tag Team Championship, and one of a select few city championships recognized by the National Wrestling Alliance. The final champion was "Wildfire" Tommy Rich before the title was eventually abandoned after 1979.

There have been a total of 13 recognized champions who have had a combined 22 official reigns, with Mr. Wrestling II holding the most at four. The longest reigning champion was "Dirty" Dick Slater, who held the title for 285 days. The shortest reigning champion was "Bullet" Bob Armstrong, whose first reign lasted only nine days.

Title history

List of top combined reigns

Footnotes

References
General

Specific

External links
NWA Macon Heavyweight Championship at Cagematch.net
NWA Macon Heavyweight Championship at Wrestlingdata.com

1973 establishments in Georgia (U.S. state)
1979 disestablishments in Georgia (U.S. state)
National Wrestling Alliance championships
Heavyweight wrestling championships
Regional professional wrestling championships